Flor do Caribe (English: Caribbean Flower) is a Brazilian telenovela produced and broadcast by TV Globo originally ran from March 11 to September 19, 2013.

Plot 
Cassiano (Henri Castelli), an air force pilot, and Ester (Grazi Massafera), a tourist guide, fall madly in love at a young age. Their love grows throughout the years until they fall victim to a treacherous plot carried out by Alberto (Igor Rickli). This unscrupulous friend, who secretly loves the young woman, creates a plan to get rid of his rival. After being assigned by Alberto to deliver diamonds in the Caribbean, Cassiano suddenly disappears and is presumed dead. While Cassiano falls prey to dangerous Dom Rafael, Alberto takes the opportunity to comfort Ester and, fulfilling his evil plan, they marry.
 
Cassiano, who remained in captivity for years, manages to escape with the help of a fellow prisoner named Duque and, pretending to be a tourist, reaches Brazil. Now he wants to square accounts with his former friend and reclaim Ester’s love.

Cast

International broadcasts
In Brazil, it was aired in Access primetime, and averaged 25 audience rating points and 50% of share. In Portugal, it aired on Globo’s basic channel and had the best premiere of a telenovela broadcast on pay-TV in the country recently. ‘Caribbean Flower’ has also been licensed to South Korea (EPG), Peru (ATV), Uruguay (Teledoce), Chile (Canal 13), and Argentina (Telefe), among other countries.

 Aired between October 20 and October 23 in chapters of 30 minutes.

 Aired 2 episodes per day.

 Aired changed timeslot at 3:00pm since December 1, 2014.

References

External links 
  
 

2013 telenovelas
Brazilian telenovelas
2013 Brazilian television series debuts
2013 Brazilian television series endings
Nazi fugitives in popular culture
Television shows filmed in Rio Grande do Norte
Television series about Nazis
TV Globo telenovelas